Blandfordia grandiflora, commonly known as Christmas bells, is a flowering plant endemic to eastern Australia. It is a tufted perennial herb with narrow, channelled, linear leaves and between two and twenty large, drooping, bell-shaped flowers. The flowers are red with yellow tips, or sometimes entirely yellow. It is one of four species of Blandfordia known as Christmas bells, this one growing on the coast and nearby ranges between Sydney in New South Wales and Fraser Island in Queensland.

Description
The flower is usually red with yellow lobes, but sometimes entirely yellow. The stamens are attached to the inside wall of the flower tube, just below its middle.

Taxonomy and naming 
Blandfordia grandiflora was first described in 1810 by Robert Brown, who collected specimens near the Hunter River. The description was published in Prodromus Florae Novae Hollandiae et Insulae Van Diemen. The name Blandfordia honors the Marquis of Blandford, and the specific epithet grandiflora is derived from the Latin word grandis meaning "great" and the suffix -flora meaning "flowered".

Distribution and habitat
This species of Christmas bells grows in damp soils on the coast and tablelands between the Hawkesbury River in New South Wales, Fraser Island in Queensland and inland as far as Glen Innes.

Use in horticulture 
Although Blandfordia grandiflora is endemic to Australia, in the nineteenth century many botanists grew it in Great Britain because it can easily be grown as a potted plant. B. grandiflora grows well in sandy soils. The wet coastal heaths of Australia, such as those found in New South Wales and Queensland, have the sandy soil necessary for it to grow. The soil should be light and well-drained, and the plant should not be in direct sunlight or in heavy shade. Although it is the most robust of the four species, B. grandiflora is very slow growing, so more aggressive plants easily swamp it in the wild.

Culture
The species was illustrated on Australian stamps issued in 1960 and Christmas 1967.

References

Flora of Queensland
Flora of New South Wales
Blandfordiaceae
Rare flora of Australia
Christmas plants
Plants described in 1810